"Gott strafe England" was an anti-British slogan used by the German Army during World War I. The phrase literally means "May God punish England". It was created by the German-Jewish poet Ernst Lissauer (1882–1937), who also wrote the poem Hassgesang gegen England (lit. "Hate song against England", better known as "Hymn of Hate").

History 

In the strained atmosphere brought on by World War I, Lissauer's Hassgesang became an instant success. Rupprecht of Bavaria, commander of the Sixth Army, ordered that copies be distributed among his troops.  The Kaiser was pleased enough to confer upon the author the Order of the Red Eagle.  An informative account of Lissauer and the "Hymn of Hate" can be found in Stefan Zweig's The World of Yesterday.

Despite the general atmosphere of condemnation against Britain for "causing the war", the Hassgesang was not without its critics. The Frankfurter Zeitung was bold enough to denounce the "impotent hatred that spits at us everywhere".
With one or two exceptions it was not widely popular among Lissauer's fellow Jews, who had a tendency to identify with England's liberal tradition.
The publicist Benjamin Segel said that the poem did not contain "as much as a spark of Jewish sentiment." Lissauer's song and slogan proved to be similarly less popular within the wider German intelligentsia. The painter, photographer, and caricaturist Helmut Herzfeld went so far as to change his given name in protest to an English one and to anglicize his surname, henceforth to be known as John Heartfield.

Unofficial stamps with the motto were produced by organisations, such as the "Federation of the Germans in Lower Austria". In at least 1916 browncoal bricks were embossed with the motto "Gott Strafe England" and sold in the Netherlands.

In England in 1916, the music hall singer, Tom Clare wrote a comic song "My Hymn of Hate" in a comic vein giving a list of people and phenomena that he hated. The list included, for example, journalists who criticized how the war was being run, but did not want to join the army themselves.

In 1946, in Hamburg, "Ausgebombte" (bombed-out refugees) chanted the slogan.

Other uses 

English poet J. C. Squire uses the phrase in his poem "God Heard the Embattled Nations":

George Bellows created a lithograph titled "Gott Strafe".
Louis Raemaekers created a cartoon titled "Gott strafe England".

The phrase gave rise to the term "strafing" and to the nickname "Strafer" that was given to the British General William Gott in World War II.

See also 
 Anti-British sentiment

References

Germany–United Kingdom relations
German words and phrases
Anti-British sentiment
World War I propaganda
Opposition to the British Empire
Quotations from military
1910s neologisms

de:Liste geflügelter Worte/G#Gott strafe England!